Zena Howard, is an American architect. She has overseen a number of high-profile projects, including the design of the National Museum of African American History and Culture in Washington, DC and the International Civil Rights Center and Museum in Greensboro, North Carolina.

Education 
Howard graduated from Rocky Mount High School in Rocky Mount, North Carolina. She received a B.S. degree in architecture from the University of Virginia.

Career 
Howard is a Principal and Managing Director at Perkins+Will in Durham, North Carolina. She has served as Senior Project Manager for the design of the National Museum of African American History and Culture, the International Civil Rights Center and Museum in Greensboro, North Carolina, and the Motown Museum expansion in Detroit, Michigan.

Howard is a founding member of her firm's Global Diversity and Inclusion Committee and is involved in projects and initiatives that aim to increase the number of women and minority architects.

Notable projects 
 National Museum of African American History and Culture, Washington, DC
 International Civil Rights Center and Museum, Greensboro, North Carolina
 Motown Museum Expansion, Detroit, Michigan
 Anacostia Library, Washington, DC
 Tenley-Friendship Neighborhood Library, Washington, DC
 Hogan's Alley Initiative, Vancouver, British Columbia
 Greenville Town Common, Sycamore Hill Gateway Plaza, Greenville, North Carolina
 Destination Crenshaw, Los Angeles, California

References 

Living people
Year of birth missing (living people)
African-American architects
American women architects
University of Virginia School of Architecture alumni
Place of birth missing (living people)
21st-century African-American people
21st-century African-American women